Zi-Yun Wei (1917 - December 27, 2005) was a Chinese classics scholar. He is most famous for his study in Jin Ping Mei, a novel written by Lanling Xiaoxiao Sheng during the Ming dynasty. In addition to Jin-Ping-Mei, his works incorporate a wide range of Chinese literature including traditional Chinese operas and grass-root novels.

Zi-Yun Wei was born in Anhui province, China. He died on December 27, 2005, at age 88.

References

External links
 Chinese wiki version with more details
 Zi-Yun Wei's site
 Publications by Zi-Yun Wei, listed on Chinese Culture University
 Books by Zi-Yun Wei, listed on 54power
 Obituary of Zi-Yun Wei on United Daily News, issue 491 聯合電子報第491期
 介绍魏子云先生的几本《金瓶梅》研究专著

Chinese academics
2005 deaths
1917 births
Writers from Anhui
Chinese literary critics
Taiwanese people from Anhui
Scholars of Chinese opera